Ruddy bin Awah is a Malaysian politician who has served as the State Assistant Minister of Education, Science, Technology and Innovation of Sabah in the Gabungan Rakyat Sabah (GRS) state administration under Chief Minister Hajiji Noor since October 2020 and Member of the Sabah State Legislative Assembly (MLA) for Pitas since September 2020. He is a member of the Parti Gagasan Rakyat Sabah (GAGASAN), a component party of the GRS coalition. He was an independent  before joining GRS as a direct member in 2022 and as a GAGASAN member in 2023.

Election results

References

Members of the Sabah State Legislative Assembly
Living people
1969 births